The Kankali Tila tablet of Sodasa, also called the Iryavati stone tablet, or Amohini ayagapata, is a large stone slab discovered in Kankali  (area of Mathura) which mentions the rule of the Northern Satraps ruler Sodasa in Mathura. The tablet in the State Museum Lucknow (room J.1). It is an important example of Mathura art.

Description
This votive tablet, which is essentially an ayagapata, though not so called, represents a royal lady attended by three women and a child. The attendant women, in accordance with the ancient Indian fashion, are naked to the waist. One holds an umbrella over her mistress, whom another fans. The third holds a wreath ready for presentation. The execution is bold, and quite artistic.

Inscription
The tablet bears a three line epigraph mentioning that in the year 42 of "the Lord, the Great Satrap  Sodasa" (   Svamisa Mahakṣatrapasa Śodasa) a monument for worship was set up by a certain Amohini. The text is as follows :

Question of the date
The inscription shows that the tablet was presented to the Jain shrine by a lady named Amohini in the year 42 or 72, in the reign of the Great Satrap Sodasa. The first numerals for the date may be read as 40, or possibly 70 (according to Buhler), so that the regnal date could be either 42 or 72  (with 72 being favoured by most).

According to Smith, the initial year of the era used by the great Satrap Sodasa is not known, but the inscription may be considered as dating a few years earlier than the Christian era or the 1st century. According to others, it is not known if the date 42/72 is a regnal year of Sodasa, or an era founded by his father or another ruler. 

According to some authors, the regnal date for Sodasa was 80 CE, so that the tablet would have been dedicated in 152 CE (50+72). A recent date for Sodasa's reign was given as 15 CE, meaning that the regnal date of the inscription would start from the Vikrama era started by Indo-Scythian king Azes I (Bikrami calendar (starting in 57 BCE)+72=15 CE). This would put the long reign of his father Rajuvula in the last quarter of the 1st century BCE, which is probable. 

Another inscription of the Satrap Sodasa was found by Alexander Cunningham in the Jail mound at Mathura. His coins also are found in the neighborhood.

Design

The Amohini tablet being quite securely dated to circa 15 CE under the reign of Sodasa, the design elements function as artistic markers for many other works of art in northern Indian. Particularly, the splayed pillar with recumbent lions and central palmette is considered as derived from Hellenistic Indo-Greek designs, and similar pillars are depicted in Bharhut, Sanchi or Bodhgaya, suggesting similar dates.

See also 
 Parsvanatha ayagapata
 Jain stupa

References

Mathura art
Jain art